Ocean Flower Island, or Haihua Island, is an under-construction, artificial archipelago located off the north coast of Danzhou, Hainan, China, west of the Yangpu Peninsula. The project has received an investment of 160 billion RMB (US$24 billion) and was scheduled for completion in 2020. During the 2021 National Day, the island attracted over 200,000 visitors.

Corruption and demolition order
Hainan politician Zhang Qi, who was later convicted of corruption, approved land reclamation for the island in conflict with environmental protection laws. The construction of the island caused damages to coral reefs and oyster populations. The boundaries of the environmental protection area around the island were later restored. 

On 30 December 2021, in the middle of its liquidity crisis, the developer Evergrande received a demolition order from the city of Danzhou relating to 39 buildings at the resort, due to planning law violation-they were built illegally. The company were given 10 days to take the buildings down. In a statement, Evergrande said the demolition notice applied "only" to buildings on plot 2-14-1 located on No. 2 Island and “does not involve other plots of land of the Ocean Flower Island project”.

See also
 List of islands of Hainan
 Forest City (Johor)
 Palm Islands - Ocean Flower Island has been reportedly inspired by this

References

External links

Islands of Hainan
Artificial islands of China
Buildings and structures in Hainan
Buildings and structures under construction in China